Golgi SNAP receptor complex member 1 is a protein that in humans is encoded by the GOSR1 gene.

This gene encodes a trafficking membrane protein which transports proteins among the endoplasmic reticulum and the Golgi apparatus and between Golgi compartments. This protein is considered an essential component of the Golgi SNAP receptor (SNARE) complex. Alternatively spliced transcript variants encoding distinct isoforms have been found for this gene.

Interactions 

GOSR1 has been shown to interact with USO1, BET1L and STX5.

References

Further reading